Cabiyarí (Caviyari) is an Arawakan language spoken along the Cananarí River in the Vaupes Region of Colombia in north western South America. The name is also spelled Cabiuarí, Cauyarí, Kauyarí, Cuyare, Kawillary.

Notes

Languages of Colombia
Indigenous languages of the South American Northwest
Endangered indigenous languages of the Americas
Arawakan languages